Five Races Under One Union was used as a national motto in Manchukuo, for the five ethnic groups of the Manchus, the Japanese, the Han Chinese, the Mongols and the Koreans. It was similar to the "Five Races Under One Union" motto used by the Republic of China, for the Han,  Manchus, Hui, Mongols and Tibetans, but the third of the four Chinese characters was changed from Togetherness (共) to Cooperation (協). Both mottoes were pronounced the same "Go zoku kyōwa" in Japanese.

This motto was symbolized in the national flag of Manchukuo, as the yellow base color (Manchus) with four striped colors in the upper left corner: red (Japanese), blue (Han Chinese), white (Mongols) and black (Koreans).

Gallery

References

National symbols
Politics of Manchukuo
1932 introductions